Veloce may refer to:

Veloce Ltd, defunct British motorcycle manufacturer commonly known as Velocette
Veloce Publishing, British book publisher
 Veloce Racing, British motor racing team
Véloce Sport, historic French cycling newspaper
Veloce Energy Inc, Innovative grid edge technology company

People with the surname
Joseph Veloce (born 1989), Canadian cyclist

See also
Scuderia Veloce, historic Australian motor racing team